Daviesia benthamii is a species of flowering plant in the family Fabaceae and is endemic to the west of Western Australia. It is an erect, bushy shrub with scattered, cylindrical, sharply pointed phyllodes, and yellow-orange and reddish-brown flowers.

Description

Taxonomy and naming
Daviesia benthamii was first formally described in 1844 by Carl Meissner in Lehmann's Plantae Preissianae from specimens collected at the Swan River by James Drummond. The specific epithet (benthamii) honours George Bentham.

Distribution and habitat
This species of pea grows in mallee, woodland and shrubland and occurs from the Ningaloo Coast to the Darling Range in the south to Merredin in the east, in the Avon Wheatbelt, Carnarvon, Coolgardie, Esperance Plains, Geraldton Sandplains, Jarrah Forest, Mallee, Swan Coastal Plain and Yalgoo biogeographic regions in the west of Western Australia.

Conservation status
Daviesia benthamii is classified as "not threatened" by the Government of Western Australia Department of Biodiversity, Conservation and Attractions.

References

benthamii
Eudicots of Western Australia
Plants described in 1844
Taxa named by Carl Meissner